Nadja Auermann (born 19 March 1971) is a German supermodel and actress. Fashion designer Valentino once commented on her physical resemblance to Marlene Dietrich. A New York Times fashion columnist, Guy Trebay, wrote of her "ice maiden visage and pole vaulter's legs". She once held the record for being the model with the longest legs in the world in the Guinness Book of Records.

Biography
In 1989, Auermann was discovered in a cafe in Berlin, which led her to sign with Karin Modeling Agency in Paris in the same year. In 1991, she moved from Karin to Elite Model Management, appearing inVogue Paris and in Benetton clothing advertisements. In September 1994, Auermann was featured on the cover of both Vogue and Harper's Bazaar, which The New York Times called "a triumph akin to winning two legs of the Triple Crown of Thoroughbred Racing".

She has walked the runways for Thierry Mugler, Chloé, Givenchy, Salvatore Ferragamo, Louis Vuitton, Valentino, Chanel, Hermès, Dolce & Gabbana, Viktor & Rolf, Prada, Jean Paul Gaultier, Versace, Giles Deacon, Vivienne Westwood, Gianfranco Ferré, Fendi, Jil Sander, Christian Dior, and Yves Saint Laurent.

Auermann has appeared in advertising campaigns for Prada, Chanel, Dolce & Gabbana, Christian Dior, Gianfranco Ferré, Versace, Donna Karan, Karl Lagerfeld, Cartier, Fendi, Yves Saint Laurent, Giorgio Armani, Valentino, H&M, Blumarine, and Hermès. She was also the international spokesperson for Shiseido in the late 1990s.

Auermann has graced over 100 covers worldwide, including American, British, French, Italian and German editions of Vogue, W, Elle, Esquire, Harper's Bazaar and i-D.

Throughout her career, Auermann has worked with numerous well-renowned photographers. The list includes Steven Meisel, Helmut Newton, Mario Testino, Richard Avedon, Patrick Demarchelier, Irving Penn, Herb Ritts, Craig McDean, Steven Klein, Inez van Lamsweerde and Vinoodh Matadin, Mario Sorrenti, Paolo Roversi, Juergen Teller and Peter Lindbergh, who reckoned her as his muse.

Personal life
In 1997, Auermann had her first child with Olaf Björn, a daughter named Cosima. Two years later, she married German actor Wolfram Grandezka. Their son, Nicolas, was born the same year. The couple divorced a few years later. Auermann gave birth to her third and fourth children with her partner in 2010 and 2013 respectively.

Auermann enjoys holidaying in the spa town of Heiligendamm, on Germany's Baltic coast.

She was convicted of tax evasion by a German court in 2011. She was fined 90,000 EUR.

In an interview with the German Press, Auermann revealed that she was living with her children and partner in Dresden.

See also
List of people from Berlin

References

External links

 
 

1971 births
Living people
German female models
German film actresses
Actresses from Berlin
Models from Berlin